Union Sportive Sainte-Marienne is a football club from Réunion based in Sainte-Marie.

Players

Current squad

First team
November 2021

Achievements
Coupe de la Réunion: 1
2010

Performance in CAF competitions
CAF Confederation Cup: 1 appearance
2011 – Preliminary round

Sainte-Marienne